Toy Soldiers is a 1991 American action film directed by Daniel Petrie Jr., with a screenplay by Petrie and David Koepp. It stars Sean Astin, Wil Wheaton, Louis Gossett Jr., Andrew Divoff, Mason Adams and Denholm Elliott.

The plot revolves around an all-male boarding school overtaken by terrorists. While the authorities remain helpless, a group of rebellious and mischievous students decide to put their resourcefulness to good use.

Plot
In Barranquilla, Colombia, terrorist Luis Cali has taken over the Palace of Justice with a team of mercenaries. He demands the release of his drug kingpin father, Enrique Cali, only to learn that his father has already been extradited to the United States to stand trial. They escape by helicopter, and with the weapons and logistics assistance of Luis's second-in-command, an American named Jack Thorpe, they enter the U.S. through Mexico.

In the United States, the Regis High School is a prep school for teenage boys with wealthy and influential parents, many of whom have been expelled from other schools. A group of pranksters led by Billy Tepper that includes Billy's best friend Joey Trotta, Hank Giles, Ricardo Montoya, Jonathan Bradberry, and Phil Donoghue are carefully watched over by their teachers and the stern but well-meaning Dean Parker. Phil's father is the Federal Judge presiding over Enrique Cali's trial, so the entire family is taken to a safe location as a precaution. Unaware of this, Luis Cali and his men invade the school to capture Donoghue, killing a campus police officer and a faculty member who intervenes. They set up lookout posts with heavy firearms and rig the campus with C-3 explosives. With Phil nowhere to be found but with the sons of numerous influential individuals in his grasp, Luis takes the entire school hostage.

Underestimating the threat, the local Sheriff attempts to intervene but is repelled by heavy weapons fire. The State Police, FBI and US Army are called in, keeping their distance to avoid provoking the terrorists. Thorpe arms the explosives with a detonator wired to a remote control gadget Luis tapes to the back of his hand. Luis warns the authorities he will set off the explosives should they attack the school. He releases the school faculty except for the cooks and the headmaster, Dr. Robert Gould, demanding his father's release in exchange for the hostages and institutes hourly headcounts.

The students, under Billy's leadership, use their expertise in skirting authority to collect tactical information about the occupying forces, which Billy covertly brings to the authorities on the outside. They won't allow Billy to return, but with Parker's encouragement, he escapes and rejoins the students just in time to be counted, preventing the killing of Gould and four students in response.

Joey's father, New Jersey mob boss Albert Trotta, arranges for Joey to be released. Joey, contemptuous of his father, refuses to go. He overpowers a guard, steals a submachine gun and opens fire on another terrorist, but is killed in the exchange. Luis tries to impress upon Parker, who comes to retrieve the body, that it was an accident, but Albert takes revenge by having Enrique Cali killed in prison.

Knowing they must act before Luis can learn of his father's death, the authorities undertake a rescue mission. FBI Hostage Rescue Team personnel (trailed by Parker), supported by the Army and armed with the information provided by Billy, covertly infiltrate the school and begin taking out the terrorists. Meanwhile, Billy and his friends sabotage the remote control receiver for the detonator, overpower their guards and lead the students and Gould to a secret basement chamber. Overwhelmed by the assault, Luis takes Billy at gunpoint and holds him in Gould's office. He presses the button on his gadget, but due to Billy's machinations only activates a toy airplane. Parker and commandos converge on Luis and Billy. Luis wounds Parker, but Billy elbows him in the abdomen, giving a commando the chance to shoot Luis, killing him.

With Parker's wound bandaged, he and Billy gain a better understanding of each other. In the end, the students are freed, the surviving terrorists are arrested and Billy joyously reunites with his friends.

Cast

 Sean Astin as William "Billy" Tepper
 Wil Wheaton as Joseph "Joey" Trotta
 Louis Gossett Jr. as Dean Edward Parker
 Keith Coogan as Jonathan "Snuffy" Bradberry
 George Perez as Ricardo "Ricky" Montoya
 T.E. Russell as Henry "Hank" Giles III
 Shawn Phelan as Derek "Yogurt" Case
 Knowl Johnson as Phil Donoghue
 Denholm Elliott as Headmaster Dr. Robert Gould
 Jerry Orbach as Albert Trotta (uncredited)
 Andrew Divoff as Luis Cali
 Michael Champion as Jack Thorpe
 Rafael H. Robledo as Carlos
 Thomas R. Trigo as Ruiz
 Jerry Valdez as Jorge
 Jesse Doran as Enrique Cali
 Mason Adams as FBI Dep. Dir. Otis Brown
 R. Lee Ermey as General Ed Kramer
 Richard Travis as Frank Ingram, a Campus Police Officer.
 Stan Kelly as Sheriff James Role
 Jeffrey Dawson as Security Guard

Production
The film was based on the novel of the same name by William P. Kennedy.

The first screenplay was written by David Koepp who wrote it for director John Schlesinger. The school was a European boarding school  and the villains were Palestinian terrorists. Schlesinger dropped out of the project and the script was rewritten to be set in the US with different villains.

The main antagonist of the film was portrayed by Andrew Divoff, who has mentioned that his role as Luis Cali was his favourite role as a bad guy. TriStar Pictures distributed in the United States and several countries.

There is a real private school named Regis High School, located on the Upper East Side of Manhattan, although this school is a Jesuit school unlike the fictional school in the film which is not. The location of the fictional Regis School in the film is a fictional King's County Virginia.  The Virginia state seal is prominent on the sheriff's car and the license plate is a Virginia public use plate. A cargo van driven by the terrorist as they kill the guard features a logo with a town name in Virginia. The school's exterior scenes were filmed at The Miller School of Albemarle in Charlottesville, Virginia. Other exterior scenes were filmed in San Antonio, Texas, Richmond, Virginia and Waynesboro, Virginia.

Reception

Box office
The film debuted at No. 3 on its opening weekend in the United States and grossed $15,073,942 nationwide during its run.

Critical response
On Rotten Tomatoes the film has an approval rating of 41% based on reviews from 17 critics. On Metacritic it has a score of 46% based on reviews from 20 critics, indicating "mixed or average reviews". Audiences surveyed by CinemaScore gave the film a grade A− on scale of A to F.

Roger Ebert gave the film 1 out of 4, stating that "Since the plot of the movie is utterly predictable, we hope at least for some cleverness in the gimmicks. Here the movie is so disappointing that I wonder if the screenwriters were really trying." Critic Clint Morris was more favorable stating "The performances are rock solid".

Awards

For their performance in Toy Soldiers, Sean Astin, Wil Wheaton, Keith Coogan, T.E. Russell and George Perez were all nominated for an Outstanding Young Ensemble Cast in a Motion Picture by the Thirteenth Annual Youth in Film Awards 1990-1991. They lost narrowly to Donovan McCrary, Desi Arnez Hines II and Baha Jackson for their performance in Boyz n the Hood.

References

External links

 
 

1991 films
1990s action drama films
Films about Colombian drug cartels
Films about terrorism
Films set in South America
Films shot in Virginia
Films shot in Texas
Films shot in San Antonio
American action drama films
Films set in schools
TriStar Pictures films
Films with screenplays by David Koepp
Films set in boarding schools
Films scored by Robert Folk
Films with screenplays by Daniel Petrie Jr.
Films directed by Daniel Petrie Jr.
1991 drama films
1991 directorial debut films
1990s American films